Yuan Chang (born 17 November 1959) is a Taiwanese-American virologist and pathologist who co-discovered together with her husband, Patrick S. Moore, the Kaposi's sarcoma-associated herpesvirus (KSHV) and Merkel cell polyomavirus, two of the seven known human oncoviruses.

Early life and education
Chang was born in Taiwan and moved to the United States as a young child. She was raised in Salt Lake City, Utah and received an MD from the University of Utah College of Medicine. Chang trained in neuropathology at Stanford University under the noted clinical neuropathologist, Dikran Horoupian, publishing studies on eosinophilia-myalgia syndrome and progressive multifocal leukoencephalopathy. During this period she contributed to studies led by her friend, Julie Parsonnet, showing that Helicobacter pylori is a cause for gastric cancer.

Career 
Chang moved to Columbia University to pursue her first academic appointment as a clinician-scientist. Although initially interested in using representational difference analysis to study the genetic origins of brain tumors, she applied this technique to Kaposi's sarcoma resulting in the discovery of this new human tumor virus. In 1994, she co-discovered KSHV, also called human herpesvirus-8 (HHV-8), working with her husband Patrick S. Moore at Columbia University. Chang, Moore and collaborators subsequently showed that this virus was the etiologic agent of Kaposi's sarcoma and primary effusion lymphoma, while others showed it to be the cause of some forms of multicentric Castleman's disease. From two small DNA fragments representing less than 1% of the viral genome, she cloned the entire KSHV 165 kbase genome and fully sequenced the virus genome within two years after its initial discovery. This led to blood tests to detect infection for this virus, discovery of viral proteins likely to cause cancer and elucidation of the role of immune evasion in carcinogenesis caused by virus infection.

Dr. Chang is now the American Cancer Society Professor in the Department of Pathology at the University of Pittsburgh. She has received a number of awards for her work, including the Meyenburg Foundation Award for Cancer Research, the Robert Koch Prize, The Sloan-Kettering Paul Marks Prize for Cancer Research, the New York City Mayor's Award for Excellence in Science & Technology, the General Motors Charles S. Mott Prize in Cancer Research, the Carnegie Science Award and an American Cancer Society Research Professorship.

Selected works

References

1959 births
American medical researchers
American pathologists
American people of Chinese descent
American virologists
Columbia University staff
Living people
Physicians from Utah
Scientists from Taipei
Taiwanese emigrants to the United States
Taiwanese medical researchers
Taiwanese pathologists
Taiwanese virologists
University of Pittsburgh faculty
University of Utah School of Medicine alumni